Christian Nicholas Braun (born April 17, 2001) is an American professional basketball player for the Denver Nuggets of the National Basketball Association (NBA). He played college basketball at the University of Kansas and was a starter on the team that won the 2022 NCAA Championship.

High school career
Braun played basketball for Blue Valley Northwest High School in Overland Park, Kansas. As a senior, he averaged 27.8 points, 9.3 rebounds and 3.8 assists per game, leading his team to a third straight Class 6A state title. He was named Mr. Kansas Basketball and Kansas Gatorade Player of the Year. He committed to playing college basketball for Kansas over offers from Kansas State, Illinois and Missouri, among others.

On April 4, 2022, the school declared that day Christian Braun Day.

College career
As a freshman at Kansas, Braun averaged 5.3 points and 2.9 rebounds per game, earning Big 12 All-Freshman Team honors. On November 27, 2020, he recorded a career-high 30 points, nine rebounds and four steals in a 94–72 win over Saint Joseph's. As a sophomore, Braun averaged 9.7 points and 5.2 rebounds per game. He was named to the Second Team All-Big 12 as a junior. In the Final Four against Villanova, he became the 65th player to reach 1,000 points for Kansas, finishing that game with 10 points and helping the Jayhawks reach the championship. In the championship game against the North Carolina Tar Heels, he had 12 points and 12 rebounds for his fifth double-double of the season, which helped Kansas rally from a 40–25 halftime deficit. In the final possession of that game, he defended Caleb Love's three-point attempt, sealing the win and giving him his first NCAA title. On April 24, 2022, Braun declared for the 2022 NBA draft, while maintaining his college eligibility. On May 25, 2022, he confirmed he would remain in the NBA draft and forego his senior season.

Professional career

Denver Nuggets (2022–present) 
Braun was picked by the Denver Nuggets with the 21st overall pick in the 2022 NBA draft. His first start for the team came on 20th December, in a home game against the Memphis Grizzlies. He played 29 minutes, recording 13 points, 3 rebounds and 1 assist, helping Denver win 105-91.

Career statistics

College

|-
| style="text-align:left;"| 2019–20
| style="text-align:left;"| Kansas
| 31 || 5 || 18.4 || .431 || .444 || .731 || 2.9 || .5 || .7 || .2 || 5.3
|-
| style="text-align:left;"| 2020–21
| style="text-align:left;"| Kansas
| 30 || 30 || 31.2 || .380 || .340 || .786 || 5.2 || 1.9|| 1.2 || .4 || 9.7
|-
| style="text-align:left;"| 2021–22
| style="text-align:left;"| Kansas
| 40 || 39 || 34.4 || .495 || .386 || .733 || 6.5 || 2.8 || 1.0 || .8 || 14.1
|- class="sortbottom"
| style="text-align:center;" colspan="2"| Career
|| 101 || 74 || 28.5 || .449 || .378 || .749 || 5.0 || 1.8 || 1.0 || .5 || 10.1

Personal life
Braun's brother, Parker, as well as his  uncle, have played college basketball for the Kansas Jayhawks. Parker currently plays for Santa Clara University. His mother's family was inducted into the Missouri Sports Hall of Fame. He also has two brothers, one older and one younger.

Braun launched a fashion line, THE CB2 Collection.

References

External links
Kansas Jayhawks bio

Living people
American men's basketball players
Basketball players from Kansas
Denver Nuggets draft picks
Denver Nuggets players
Kansas Jayhawks men's basketball players
People from Burlington, Kansas
Shooting guards
2001 births